Croxley may refer to :

 Croxley Green, a parish in Hertfordshire, England, United Kingdom
Croxley tube station, a station on the London Underground in Croxley Green
Croxley Rail Link, a proposed rail re-route of the London Underground at Croxley Green
Croxley Green railway station, a disused railway station
Croxley Green Windmill, a Grade II listed building in Croxley Green